Andreu Buenafuente Moreno (born: January 24, 1965) is a Spanish late night show host and founder of the group El Terrat. He has worked in TV3, Antena 3, laSexta and #0. He has also worked as a radio host and has published several books with his monologues.

He and Silvia Abril hosted the 33rd Goya Awards on 2 February 2019.

Career on television
Sense Títol (TV3) (1995)
Sense Títol 2 (TV3) (1996)
Sense Títol, Sense Vacances (TV3) (1997)
Sense Títol Sense Número (TV3) (1998)
La cosa nostra (TV3) (1999-2002)
Una altra cosa (TV3) (2002-2004)
Buenafuente (2005-2011) Antena 3  / laSexta 
Buenas noches y Buenafuente (2012) Antena 3
En el aire (2013-2015) laSexta
Late Motiv (2016-) #0

References

External links 

Spanish television personalities
Spanish male comedians
1955 births
Living people
Spanish stand-up comedians
People from Reus
Writers from Catalonia